Gnorismomyia is a genus of flies in the family Stratiomyidae. Its only species is Gnorismomyia flavicornis. It is found in Taiwan.

References

Stratiomyidae
Brachycera genera
Taxa named by Kálmán Kertész
Diptera of Asia
Endemic fauna of Taiwan
Taxa described in 1914
Monotypic Diptera genera